Alfred Damon Lindley (January 20, 1904 – February 22, 1951) was an American lawyer and sportsman. He participated in a wide variety of sports, including rowing (where he won the gold medal in the eights in the 1924 Summer Olympics), skiing (in which he competed at the 1936 Winter Olympics) and mountaineering (in which his achievements included the second ascent of Denali). He was also politically active as a supporter of Harold Stassen and a candidate for several offices himself. He died in an airplane crash in 1951.

References

External links
 
 

1904 births
1951 deaths
Accidental deaths in Nebraska
American male rowers
American male alpine skiers
American mountain climbers
Medalists at the 1924 Summer Olympics
Olympic gold medalists for the United States in rowing
Rowers at the 1924 Summer Olympics
Victims of aviation accidents or incidents in 1951
Victims of aviation accidents or incidents in the United States
Yale University alumni
Yale Bulldogs men's ice hockey players